Edward Robinson (November 1, 1858, Boston – April 18, 1931, New York City) was an American writer and authority on art.

Biography
He graduated from Harvard in 1879, and spent the following five years in study, especially in Greece (15 months) and in Berlin (3 semesters), devoting his attention chiefly to archaeology. 

From 1895 to 1902, he was curator of classical antiquities in the Boston Museum of Fine Arts, and beginning in 1902 was director of the museum for three years. He became assistant director of the Metropolitan Museum of Art in New York in 1906, and succeeded Sir Caspar Purdon Clarke in 1910, becoming the third director of "the Met", a position he held for 21 years. He lectured on archaeology at Harvard in 1893-94 and in 1898-1902, and was secretary of the Art commission of Boston in 1890-98. He prepared catalogues and contributed many articles on art and archaeological subjects for magazines. He was a member of many learned societies.

References

References
 
 

1858 births
1931 deaths
American archaeologists
American art curators
Harvard College alumni
Writers from Boston
Directors of museums in the United States